James Paull (1901–1983) was a West Virginia politician.

James Paull may also refer to:

James Paull (judge) (1818–1875), Justice of the Supreme Court of Appeals of West Virginia
James Paull (MP) (1770–1808), British politician and duellist
James Paull (moderator), minister of the Church of Scotland 
James Paull (musician) (died 2008), Australian guitarist in the band TISM

See also
James Paul (disambiguation)